On 1 January 2010, the 26 districts were combined into 10 new precincts:

They are grouped into five regions.

The existence of the 26 districts remains through the laws and Constitution of the Canton of Berne (Art.3 al.2 Cst) and coexists with the new 10 precincts.

 there were 338 municipalities of the canton of Bern.

Precincts 2010

Districts 

The canton of Bern is also subdivided into 26 districts, which have no more administrative or political significance since the introduction of the new larger administrative subdivisions listed above.

The districts are:
Aarberg with capital Aarberg
Aarwangen with capital Aarwangen
Bern with capital Bern
Biel with capital Biel
Büren with capital Büren an der Aare
Burgdorf with capital Burgdorf
Courtelary with capital Courtelary
Erlach with capital Erlach
Fraubrunnen with capital Fraubrunnen
Frutigen with capital Frutigen
Interlaken with capital Interlaken
Konolfingen with capital Konolfingen
Laupen with capital Laupen
Moutier with capital Moutier
La Neuveville with capital La Neuveville
Nidau with capital Nidau
Niedersimmental with capital Wimmis
Oberhasli with capital Meiringen
Obersimmental with capital Blankenburg
Saanen with capital Saanen
Schwarzenburg with capital Schwarzenburg
Seftigen with capital Belp
Signau with capital Langnau im Emmental
Thun with capital Thun
Trachselwald with capital Trachselwald
Wangen with capital Wangen an der Aare

Maps 1978 - 2010

Notes and references 

 
Geography of the canton of Bern